"Se piovesse il tuo nome" (in Italian, "If it rains your name") is a song by Italian singer Elisa. It was written by singer-songwriter Calcutta, Vanni Casagrande and Dario Faini and produced by Elisa with Andrea Rigonat and Taketo Gohara.

It was released by Universal Music Group on 28 September 2018 as the first single from Elisa's tenth studio album Diari aperti. On 14 December 2018 it was released a version of the single sung with its author Calcutta. "Se piovesse il tuo nome" peaked at number 4 on the Italian FIMI Singles Chart and was certified double platinum in Italy.

Background
Elisa explained the song is about an ended relationship which is still present; the singer can't  calm down her "thirst for love" in the lyrics. The song "plays between harmony and visionary lyrics, mixing the it-pop approach with the melodies of the best songwriting".

Critical reception
Paola Gallo from Onde Funky said, "The clear voice of Elisa that molds itself perfectly to the music and makes life lived and clear photographs of everyday stories and feelings flow [...] The feeling is that Elisa really wants to talk about herself again as in an intimate and definitive x-ray." Caterina Civallero and Maria Luisa Rossi from Uno Editori opined that "Se piovesse il tuo nome" was an "exceptional blend: the woman sings, the songwriter elaborates and the singer interprets. It is love to the nth degree, generated and multiplied through the passages that reach us full of phatos and eros, that light and modest eros that moves between veils and cups of water to drink together."

Commercial performance
First debuting at number seven on the FIMI singles chart, the song gained positions week after week reaching the top position on the Italian airplay chart for four consecutive weeks. After almost three months since its publication, the song reached number four on the Singles Chart, during its fifty-first week charting.

Music video
The music video for the song was released on YouTube on 28 February 2018, to accompany the single's publication. Realized in black & white and directed by the duo YouNuts!, the video shows Elisa moving under the rain in several places, directly referring to the song's lyrics.

Live performances
Elisa performed the song live at the Premio Tenco 2018.

Track listing

Charts

Weekly charts

Year-end charts

Certifications

References

2018 singles
2018 songs
Elisa (Italian singer) songs
Songs written by Calcutta (singer)
Songs written by Dario Faini